Roberto Fortunato Poblete Zapata (Los Ángeles, January 8, 1955) is a Chilean actor, director, teacher, presenter, announcer and politician. He is known for having participated in several television series on Canal 13 and Chilevisión. He served as a deputy for Los Angeles from 2014 to 2018.

Performing arts career 

Roberto Poblete was born in the city of Los Angeles in 1955. His parents are Fortunato Poblete and María Zapata from Quillón and Mulchén respectively. He studied at the German Lyceum in the city of Los Angeles.

He studied at the School of Communication Arts at the Catholic University of Chile. He graduated as an actor in 1979 with the thesis Relationships in the construction of the character.

He is a candidate for a Master of Arts, with a Mention in Theater Directing, from the University of Chile.

He has acted in numerous plays such as Dreams of bad death (1982), Spring with a broken corner (1984), The clowns of hope, Our father who are in bed (2002), Dreams of memory (2004), Squatting (2005) —for which he was nominated for Altazor 2006—, El grito (2006), Atascados en la Salala (2009), Nice country corner with a sea view (2010), Get up and run (2011) and Someone has to stop (2013).

He has also dedicated himself to the theatrical direction of various productions such as We were all going to be queens, Three nights on a Saturday and The King arrives.

He has done extensive teaching work at various universities in the country, including the Pontificia Universidad Católica de Chile, UNIACC and Universidad de Santiago de Chile. He was the director and founder of the theater career at the Bolivarian University of Los Angeles.

In cinema, he participated in the feature films Sexto A (1985) and Dos mujeres en la ciudad (1990), both by Claudio di Girólamo; La estación del regreso (1987) of Leo Kocking; La historia de un roble solo (1982) and La luna en el espejo (1990), both by Silvio Caiozzi; País de octubre (1990) by Daniel de la Vega; and Cuestión de ubicación of Luciano Tarifeño.

He has acted in various telenovelas such as Villa Los Aromos (1981), Los títeres (1984), La última cruz, Cerro Alegre, Marrón Glacé (1993), El amor está de moda (1995), and Marparaíso (1998) . He has also participated in television series such as Crónicas de un hombre santo (1990), La patrulla del desierto (1993) and Casados (2005); and in various children's and comedy programs, such as El desjueves, De Chincol a Jote, a program where he popularized the section "Humbertito y Gaspar" with Cristián García-Huidobro, Vamos Chile, El tiempo es oro, among others.

Political career 
In the 2013 parliamentary elections, he ran as a candidate for the Chamber of Deputies for the 47th district, which includes, among other places, the city of Los Angeles, supported by the Socialist Party of Chile. He obtained 12.96% of the votes, remaining thirdly, but being elected due to the Binomial voting. He took office on March 11, 2014. He is a member of the permanent commissions on Human Rights and Indigenous Peoples; Economy, Development; Micro, Small and Medium Enterprises; Consumer Protection and Tourism; and Culture, Arts and Communications.

He sought to once again integrate the Chamber of Deputies, this time for the new 21st district, in the 2017 parliamentary elections. He obtained 12,309 votes, equivalent to 6.46%, not being re-elected.

Filmography

Films
 Historia de un roble solo (1982)
 VIº A 1965 (1986)
 La estación del regreso (1987)
 País de octubre (1990)
 La Luna en el espejo (1990)
 Dos mujeres en la ciudad (1990)
 The Wandering Soap Opera (1990, released in 2017)

Telenovelas

TV Series 
 De chincol a jote (Canal 13, 1987–1993) – Varios personajes
 La patrulla del desierto (Canal 13, 1993) – Pedro Salcedo
 Vamos Chile (Red TV, 2003)
 Casado con hijos (Mega, 2007) – Dr. Indigo

References 

1955 births
Chilean television actors
Chilean film actors
20th-century Chilean actors
21st-century Chilean actors
Chilean politicians
Chilean television presenters
Living people
Chilean male comedians
Chilean actor-politicians